McLoud High School is a public secondary school located in Pottawatomie County, Oklahoma in the town of McLoud. It instructs grades 9–12. It is a part of the McLoud Public School District, which also includes McLoud Elementary School and McLoud Junior High.

McLoud High School currently has 621 students enrolled, giving it a student to teacher ratio of 36:1. Its mascot is the Redskins and its school colors are red, black, and white.

See also
Native American mascot controversy
Sports teams named Redskins

References

Educational institutions in the United States with year of establishment missing
Public high schools in Oklahoma
Schools in Pottawatomie County, Oklahoma